Slaves in Their Bonds is a 2008 Greek drama film directed by based on the eponymous novel by Konstantinos Theotokis. It was Greece's submission to the 82nd Academy Awards for the Academy Award for Best Foreign Language Film, but was not accepted as a nominee.

Cast 
Giannis Fertis as Alexandros Ophiomachus
Dimitra Matsouka  as  Aimilia Valsami
Akis Sakellariou  as  Aristeidis Steriotis
Christos Loulis as Giorgis Ophiomachus
Eirini Inglesi as Maria Ophiomachus
Rynio Kyriazi as Evlalia  Ophiomachus
Konstantinos Papachronis as Alkis Sozomenos.  
Lena Papaligoura as Luiza Ophiomachus
Giorgos Spanias as Spyros Ophiomachus

Awards
winner:  
2008: Greek State Film Awards for best director (Adonis Lykouresis)
2008: Greek State Film Awards for best screenplay (Adonis Lykouresis, Yannis Maroudas, Maria Vardaka)
2008: Greek State Film Awards for best actor (Giannis Fertis)
2008: Greek State Film Awards for best supporting actor (Christos Loulis)
2008: Greek State Film Awards for best supporting actress (Dimitra Matsouka)
2008: Greek State Film Awards for best music (Minos Matsas)
2008: Greek State Film Awards for best sound
2008: Greek State Film Awards for best set decoration
2008: Greek State Film Awards for best film (second place)
2008: Greek State Film Awards for Best Make up

References

External links 

2008 drama films
2008 films
Films based on Greek novels
Greek drama films
Films shot in Corfu